Tey 25 Pashahid Hoseyn Shahram Far (also Romanized as Tey 25 Pashahīd Ḩoseyn Shahrām Far) is a village in Lahijan-e Sharqi Rural District, Lajan District, Piranshahr County, West Azerbaijan Province, Iran. At the 2006 census, its population was 502, in 134 families.

References 

Populated places in Piranshahr County